Abdoulaye Traoré may refer to:

Abdoulaye Traoré (athlete) (born 1959), Malian Olympic athlete
Abdoulaye Traoré (Ivorian footballer) (born 1967)
Abdoulaye Traoré (Malian footballer) (born 1970)
Abdoulaye Traoré (Burkinabé footballer) (born 1974)
Abdoullaye Traoré (born 2000), Italian-Ivorian footballer